A lowrider is a car or truck modified to have less ground clearance than most other cars.

Lowrider may also refer to:

Music

Bands
 Lowrider (Australian band), a hip-hop soul band
 Lowrider (Swedish band), a stoner-rock band
 Lowrider Band, an American band

Songs
 "Low Rider", a song by War
 "Lowrider" (Cypress Hill song)

Other
 Lowriders (film), a 2016 American drama
 Low Rider, one of the ring names of professional wrestler Matt Barela
 Lowrider (video game), a 2002 video game made for PlayStation 2
 Lowrider bicycle, a modified bicycle in the style of a lowrider car
 Low rider bicycle luggage carrier, a way to carry luggage on a bicycle to with a low center of gravity
 Lowrider (magazine), an American monthly magazine on automobiles
 Nazi Lowriders, American prison gang